Predrag Pašić (born 18 October 1958) is a Bosnian retired professional footballer who played as an attacking midfielder or as a forward.

Club career
During his career, he played for hometown club Sarajevo and German clubs VfB Stuttgart and TSV 1860 Munich. Pašić won the 1984–85 Yugoslav First League with Sarajevo and that same season was named Yugoslav First League Player of the Season.

International career
Pašić played for the Yugoslavia Olympic team, winning a gold medal at the 1979 Mediterranean Games. He made his senior debut for Yugoslavia in a March 1981 friendly match against Bulgaria and has earned a total of 10 caps, scoring 1 goal. He was a non-playing squad member at the 1982 FIFA World Cup and his final international was a March 1985 World Cup qualification match against Luxembourg.

Career statistics

Club

International

International goals

''Scores and results table. Yugoslavia's goal tally first:

Honours

Player
Sarajevo
Yugoslav First League: 1984–85

Yugoslavia Olympic
Mediterranean Games: 1979

Individual
Awards
Yugoslav First League Player of the Season: 1984–85

References

External links

Profile at Reprezentacija.rs 
 Les rebelles du foot (2012), documentary produced and hosted by Eric Cantona

1958 births
Living people
Footballers from Sarajevo
Serbs of Bosnia and Herzegovina
Association football midfielders
Association football forwards
Yugoslav footballers
Yugoslavia international footballers
Competitors at the 1979 Mediterranean Games
Mediterranean Games gold medalists for Yugoslavia
Mediterranean Games medalists in football
1982 FIFA World Cup players
FK Sarajevo players
VfB Stuttgart players
TSV 1860 Munich players
Yugoslav First League players
Bundesliga players
Oberliga (football) players
Yugoslav expatriate footballers
Expatriate footballers in West Germany
Yugoslav expatriate sportspeople in Germany